The  is a two-car battery electric multiple unit (BEMU) train type operated by East Japan Railway Company (JR East) on the Karasuyama Line and Tohoku Main Line since 15 March 2014. The train goes by the nickname .

Overview
It can also be recharged via its pantographs at a recharging facility specially built at Karasuyama Station.

Formation
The two-car trains are formed as shown below, with car 1 at the Utsunomiya end.

The Mc car has two PS38 single-arm pantographs.

Interior
Internally, the train uses LED lighting throughout. Seating accommodation consists of longitudinal bench seating. The train is not equipped with a toilet.

Bogies
Each car is mounted on a TR255D non-powered trailer bogie at the outer end, and a DT79 motored bogie at the inner end.

History

The first set, V1, was delivered from the Japan Transport Engineering Company (J-TREC) factory in Yokohama on 21 January 2014. Test running commenced on 23 January, on the Utsunomiya Line, including running on battery power with the pantographs lowered. It entered revenue service on the Karasuyama Line from the start of the revised timetable on 15 March 2014.

In May 2015, the EV-E301 series was awarded the 2015 Laurel Prize, presented annually by the Japan Railfan Club. A presentation ceremony was held at Karasuyama Station on 26 September 2015.

A further three two-car EV-E301 series trainsets were delivered to Utsunomiya from the J-TREC factory in Yokohama in February 2017. These entered service from the start of the revised timetable on 4 March 2017, replacing the remaining diesel multiple unit trains operating on the Karasuyama Line.

See also
 Smart BEST, a self-charging BEMU train developed by Kinki Sharyo in 2012
 BEC819 series, an AC BEMU introduced by JR Kyushu in 2016
 EV-E801 series, an AC BEMU introduced by JR East on the Oga Line in 2017

References

Electric multiple units of Japan
East Japan Railway Company
Train-related introductions in 2014
1500 V DC multiple units of Japan
Battery electric multiple units
J-TREC multiple units